The .338 Ruger Compact Magnum or .338 RCM is a rimless, short-length rifle cartridge based on the .375 Ruger case. Sturm Ruger and Hornady jointly developed the round, which was released in 2008 and chambered in various Ruger rifles. The goal of the project was to produce a .338 caliber cartridge with magnum level performance that would fit in a compact, short action rifle. The .338 RCM is conceptually similar to the WSM cartridge family, but is somewhat smaller dimensionally. This often allows for a higher magazine capacity than the WSM equivalent. Like the .338 caliber cartridges which predated it, the round is designed for hunting medium to large sized North American game.

Design & Specifications
The .338 Ruger Compact Magnum is based on the .375 Ruger cartridge, which originated with Hornady and Ruger. This design offers greater case capacity than a belted magnum case of equal length. Unlike the Winchester Short Magnum cartridges, the Ruger Compact Magnums share the same diameter from case head to body. This allowed Ruger to chamber the cartridge without extensively redesigning their M77 rifle.

See also
 .338 Lapua Magnum
 .338 Marlin express
 .338 Federal
 .338 Remington Ultra Magnum
 .338 Winchester Magnum
 Table of handgun and rifle cartridges

References

 C.I.P. TDCC (Tables of Dimensions of Cartridges and Chambers) .338 RCM

External links
 Hornady Introduces .300 and .338 RCM (Ruger Compact Magnum) Hornady Press Release
 Short but Sweet RifleShooter Article
 338 RCM: Big Power – Small Package
 Ruger's M77 Hawkeye Compact Magnum Part II: Handloading the .338 RCM Realguns.com

Sturm, Ruger & Company
Pistol and rifle cartridges